Henry Rice may refer to:

Henry Rice (politician) (1786–1867), American merchant and politician from Massachusetts
Henry Rice (writer) (1585 or 1586 – 1651), Welsh writer and courtier
Henry Mower Rice (1816–1894), American politician
Henry Mower Rice (Triebel), a 1916 marble sculpture by Frederick Triebel
Henry Gordon Rice (1920–2003), American logician and mathematician, author of Rice's theorem
Henry Rice Guild, American lawyer, director of the Pioneer Fund

See also
Harry Rice (1901–1971), American baseball outfielder